Woolamai was a railway station on the Wonthaggi line located on the Bass Coast, Victoria. The station opened with the line in 1910 and operated until the line's closure in 1978.  The platform mound and a nearby level crossing are the only remains of the railway in this area.

Disused railway stations in Victoria (Australia)
Transport in Gippsland (region)
Bass Coast Shire